Judith Hoffberg (May 19, 1934 – January 16, 2009) was a librarian, archivist, lecturer, a curator and art writer, and editor and publisher of Umbrella, a newsletter on artist's books, mail art, and Fluxus art.

Biography
Hoffberg received a B.A. in Political Science from UCLA in 1956. She went on to get an M.A. in Italian Language and Literature in 1960 and an M.L.S. from the UCLA School of Library Service in June 1964.

She was a Special Intern at the Library of Congress after serving as a cataloguer in 1964–65 at the Johns Hopkins University Bologna Center in Italy. At the Library of Congress, she was a cataloguer in the Prints & Photographs Division until 1967, when she served as the Fine Arts Librarian at the University of Pennsylvania from 1967–1969. She went on to UCSD from 1969 to 1971 as art, literature and language bibliographer and to the Brand Library in Glendale, CA as Director from 1971 to 1973. From 1974 to 1976, she worked for the Smithsonian Institution as Archivist and Editorial Assistant for the Bicentennial Bibliography of American Arts.

In 1972, she co-founded Art Libraries Society of North America (ARLIS). She served as the Society's first Chairman, editor of ARLIS/NA Newsletter from 1972 to 1977 and its Executive Secretary from 1974 to 1977.

In 1978, Hoffberg founded Umbrella Associates. Her work included consulting with archives and libraries. She edited and published Umbrella, a newsletter about artists' books and publications. In her work as a writer, editor, and curator, she enthusiastically championed Fluxus, inexpensive artists' books, mail art, rubber-stamp art, and many other offbeat forms of expression of the second half of the 20th century. Hoffberg also lectured widely throughout the US and abroad. Her collection of artist/s books is split between the University of California at Los Angeles and the UCSB; her collection of some 15,000 pieces of Umbrelliana is at the UCSD, in La Jolla.

In 2000, Hoffberg and Béatrice Coron founded the International Edible Book Festival.

Hoffberg was diagnosed with acute myeloid leukemia in 2008 and died of lymphoma the following year.

Grants and awards
 National Endowment for the Arts, Service to the Field, 1980, 1981
 Australia & New Zealand Arts Council grants, lecture tour, 1982
 Dutch Government Research Trant, 1982
 British Council Grant, 1983
 Fulbright Research & Lecture Grant, 1984, (in New Zealand to work on Len Lye’s archives)
 Fluxus Research Fellow, Sonja Henie & Niels Onstad Foundation, Oslo, Norway

Curatorial Activities
 Artwords & Bookworks, (LAICA), Los Angeles, which traveled to Herron School of Art (Indianapolis) Contemporary Art Center (New Orleans), Franklin Furnace (New York), Australia & New Zealand (1978–79), co-curator: Joan Hugo
 Book Exhibition, University of Massachusetts Amherst, 1978
 The Umbrella Show, University of California, Riverside, 1979
 Art & Society: Bookworks by Women, Beyond Baroque, Venice, CA, 1981
 Ex Libris, Bookworks by Artists, Traction Gallery, Los Angeles, CA, 1981
 Some Important Announcements, Santa Monica Public Library for the Santa Monica Arts Commission, 1985
 Editions & Additions: International Bookworks, Idea, Sacramento, CA, Northlight Gallery, Tempe, AZ, and UC Riverside, March 1986
 Undercover: The Book as Format, Fresno Arts Center, 1987
 Art from the Page: Bookworks, Salem Art Association, Bush Barn, Salem, Oregon and Texas Woman's University, Denton, TX, 1987
 A Book of His Own: Men’s Visual Diaries, Woodland Pattern Book Center, Milwaukee, WI, 1987
 A Book in Hand, Arvada Center for the Arts & Humanities, Arvada, CO, 1989
 A Book of His Own: Man’s Visual Diaries, UCLA Art Library, 1990
 Cross <+> Currents: Books from the Edge of the Pacific, travelling artists’ books exhibition beginning in California and travelling 1991–1993 to UCSB, Cal State Hayward, Ringling School of Art and Design, Oregon School of Arts & Crafts
 Boundless Vision: Contemporary Bookworks, San Antonio Art Institute, 1991
 Freedom: International Mail Art Show, Armory for the Arts, Pasadena, CA, 1992
 The Amazing Decade: Women and Performance Art in America, 1970-1980, New Gallery, Santa Monica, CA, 1993
 Shaped Structures: Bookworks in Form, Palos Verdes Art Center, Palos Verdes, CA, 1993
 Multiple World: An International Survey of Artists’ Books, co-curated by Peter Frank, at Atlanta College of Art, Atlanta, GA, 1994
 John O’ Brien: Passe-partout: A Revised Study, New Gallery, Santa Monica, 1994
 Barbara Turner Smith: Who are We?..Hirokazu Kosaka: Woman with Mole, New Gallery, Santa Monica, CA, 1994
 Journey/Journals: Elsa Flores & Gronk, New Gallery, Santa Monica, CA, 1994
 Boundless: Liberating the Book Form, San Francisco Center for the Book, 1998
 Women of the Book: Jewish Artists, Jewish Themes, travelling exhibition which opened in Finegood Art Gallery in 1997–1998 and has traveled to Kutztown, University of Pennsylvania, Florida Atlantic University, Brattleboro Art Museum, JCC of Minneapolis/Minnesota Center for Book Arts, Chicago, IL, La Jolla, CA and the La Sierra University, Riverside, CA, Missouri State University, Springfield, Missouri, and Rutgers University, Camden, NJ.
 "Six Degrees:  Art in the Libraries," sponsored by Side St. Projects, Pasadena, CA, co-curated by Karen Atkinson and Sam Erenberg, 2001

Publications
 Co-Editor, Directory of Art Libraries & Visual Resource Collections in North America (New York, Neal Schuman, 1978)
 "Bibliography of Women Artists’ Books", Chrysalis (Spring 1978)
 "Artists’ Books" in Art & Technology: The History & Method of Fine Papermaking (San Francisco, World Print Council, 1979)
 Editor & Publisher, Artists’ Publications in Print, 1980–83
 "Art Book Column" in High Performance Magazine, 1984–1994
 "Distribution and its Discontents" in Art Papers (Atlanta) May–June 1990
 Publisher, Cross<+>Currents: Books from the Edge of the Pacific (Pasadena, Umbrella Associates, 1992)
 "Learning to Read Art: The Art of Artists’ Books," The New Bookbinder, vol. 13, 1993
 Publisher, The Book Maker’s Desire: Writings on the Art of the Book by Buzz Spector (Pasadena, Umbrella Editions, 1995)
 Publisher, Umbrella: The Anthology (Santa Monica, Umbrella Editions, 2000)
 Editor and author, Women of the Book: Jewish Artists, Jewish Themes (Boca Raton, Friends of the Library, 2001)

External links
 The Mail-Interview with Judith A. Hoffberg
 Umbrella Digital Archive

References

1934 births
2009 deaths
American librarians
American women librarians
American art curators
Art writers
20th-century American women writers
UCLA Graduate School of Education and Information Studies alumni
University of California, Los Angeles alumni
Deaths from lymphoma
Deaths from cancer in California
21st-century American women
American women curators